Kali-ye Sofla (also Romanized as Kalī-ye Soflá; also known as Kalī-ye Pā‘īn) is a village in Dodangeh Rural District, Hurand District, Ahar County, East Azerbaijan Province, Iran. At the 2006 census, its population was 167, in 33 families.

References 

Populated places in Ahar County